Robert Wesley "Wes" Mason (born in Norfolk, Virginia) is an American actor and singer known for originating the baritone role of Reinaldo Arenas (as Wes Mason) in the world premiere of Jorge Martín's opera adaptation of Before Night Falls.

References

External links

Year of birth missing (living people)
Living people
Actors from Norfolk, Virginia
American male stage actors
American operatic baritones
Musicians from Norfolk, Virginia
Classical musicians from Virginia